The official results of the Men's 10,000 metres Race at the 1968 Summer Olympics in Mexico City, Mexico held on Sunday October 13, 1968. There were a total number of 37 competitors from 23 nations.

While Abebe Bikila had won the Marathon in the two previous Olympics to show Ethiopia's ability, this was Kenya's first ever gold medal, with Naftali Temu outsprinting leader Mamo Wolde on the home straight.

Final ranking

References

External links
 Results

 
10,000 metres at the Olympics
Men's events at the 1968 Summer Olympics